The Peavey Classic 30 112 is a guitar amplifier produced by Peavey Electronics. It is a tube amplifier designed for Blues, Country and Rock musicians. The Classic 30 112 is a member of the Classic Series family of amplifiers. The amps are known for their durability, flexibility, and tone. Earlier models were dressed in black tolex, while more recent models are dressed in a diagonal tweed material.

Characteristics
Spring Reverb with level control
Pre- and post-gain controls on lead channel
External speaker capability
30 watts (rms) into 16 or 8 ohms
2-channel preamp
Four EL84 power tubes and three 12AX7 preamp tubes
Solid state rectifier
12 inch Blue Marvel speaker
Effects loop
Normal volume control on clean channel
Boost switch
Optional footswitch control for reverb, channel switching, and boost
3-band passive EQ (bass, middle, treble)

Jack Daniel's JD30-T

Over the years, Peavey has produced a number of signature and specialty instruments and accessories adorned with the label of Jack Daniel's whiskey. One such item that was produced in a limited run was a redressed version of the Classic 30, dubbed the Jack Daniel's JD30-T. This amp was dressed in a black tweed covering with a custom weave grill cloth, and had a black powder-coat chassis and control face decorated with knobs bearing the "Old No. 7 Brand" logo.

References

Instrument amplifiers
Peavey amplifiers